The Brandberg thick-toed gecko (Pachydactylus gaiasensis) is a species of lizard in the family Gekkonidae. It is endemic to Namibia.

References

Endemic fauna of Namibia
Pachydactylus
Reptiles described in 1967
Reptiles of Namibia